Edward 'Ed' Rubinoff (born July 12, 1935) is an American male former tennis player who was active in the 1960s. He won the 1952 singles title at the Orange Bowl junior tennis tournament, and the 1953 mixed doubles title the following year. At the US Open, he was a mixed doubles finalist three times. At the 1969 Maccabiah Games in Israel, he won a gold medal in mixed doubles with Julie Heldman.

Rubinoff played collegiate tennis for the Miami Hurricanes at the University of Miami in Coral Gables, Florida.

Biography
Rubinoff was born in Brooklyn, New York and at age 10 moved to Miami Beach, Florida. He became captain of the Miami Beach Senior High School tennis team, and in 1952 won the National Scholastic singles and doubles titles. He received a full scholarship to the University of Miami.

In 1952, he won the singles title at the Orange Bowl junior tennis tournament and in 1953, the mixed doubles title with Sylvia Ger. In 1962 he won the doubles title with Gardnar Mulloy at the Monte Carlo Championhships.

His best performances at the Grand Slam tournaments were achieved in the mixed doubles where he was a runner-up at the US Open on three occasions. In 1963, he reached the final with Judy Tegart and lost to Margaret Court and Ken Fletcher in three sets. In 1964, Tegart and Rubinoff were defeated in the final by Margaret Court and John Newcombe. His last appearance in the final came in 1966 when he teamed with Carol Aucamp and were beaten in straight sets in the final by Donna Floyd and Owen Davidson.

Rubinoff competed in the Wimbledon Championships in 1962 and 1963, entering all three events (singles, doubles, mixed). He reached the second round of the singles event in 1963. In the doubles, he teamed with compatriot Gardnar Mulloy in 1962 and lost in the second round to eventual champions Fred Stolle and Bob Hewitt. With Donna Floyd, he reached the third round in the mixed doubles in 1963.

At the 1969 Maccabiah Games in Israel, he and American Julie Heldman, who was ranked # 2 in the US, won a gold medal in the mixed doubles, defeating South African silver medalists  Jack Saul and Esmé Emmanuel. He and partner Leonard Schloss won a silver medal in the men's doubles, losing in the finals to American Davis Cup player Allen Fox and Ronald Goldman.

After his tennis career, Rubinoff enrolled at the University of Miami School of Law and graduated in 1966. In the 1980s, he shifted his practice to plaintiff's work, representing individuals rather than insurance companies and corporate defendants. In 1992, Rubinoff and Kutner founded the firm now known as Kutner, Rubinoff & Moss. Rubinoff is a member and former president of the University of Miami Sports Hall of Fame, a member of the Florida Tennis Hall of Fame, and is the chairman of the board of the Greater Miami Tennis Foundation. Rubinoff is married and has a son and daughter.

Grand Slam finals

Mixed doubles (3 runner-ups)

References

1935 births
American male tennis players
Jewish American sportspeople
Tennis people from New York (state)
Sportspeople from Brooklyn
Living people
Miami Hurricanes men's tennis players
Tennis people from Florida
Jewish tennis players
Maccabiah Games gold medalists for the United States
Maccabiah Games silver medalists for the United States
Maccabiah Games medalists in tennis
Competitors at the 1969 Maccabiah Games